The Kinnikuman manga by Yudetamago was adapted into two anime television series by Toei Animation. The original series, simply titled  aired on Nippon Television (NTV) affiliates from April 3, 1983 to October 1, 1986, lasting 137 episodes. The second series, aired on NTV affiliates from October 6, 1991 to September 27, 1992, with 46 episodes.

Kinnikuman

Kaijū Extermination Arc

20th Choujin Olympics Arc

American Tour Arc

21st Choujin Olympics Arc

Seven Akuma Choujin Arc

Golden Mask Arc

Dream Choujin Tag Arc

Psycho Choujin Arc

Goku'aku Choujin Arc

Kinnikuman: Kinniku-sei Ōi Sōdatsu-hen

External links
Kinnikuman the Movie DVD Boxset (archived) (Japanese) - contains links to the TV series boxsets as well

Episodes
Kinnikuman